The Hudson House is a historic house at 304 West 15th Street in Pine Bluff, Arkansas, USA. It is a 2-½ story structure, faced with brick on the main floors, and with half-timbered stucco in the front-facing gable. which is further accentuated by large brackets.  A single-story hip-roofed porch extends across the front, supported by brick piers.  The house was designed by Charles L. Thompson and was built in 1911. It is a high-quality local example of Craftsman architecture.

The house was listed on the National Register of Historic Places in 1982.

See also
National Register of Historic Places listings in Jefferson County, Arkansas

References

Houses completed in 1911
Houses in Pine Bluff, Arkansas
Houses on the National Register of Historic Places in Arkansas
National Register of Historic Places in Pine Bluff, Arkansas